The Guildhall is one of the main office buildings of the City and County of Swansea Council. The Guildhall complex, which includes the City Hall, Brangwyn Hall (concert hall) and the County Law Courts for Swansea, is a Grade I listed building.

History

The building was commissioned to replace the old Swansea Guildhall. The site selected for the building had previously formed part of Victoria Park. The foundation stone for the building was laid on 4 May 1932. The building was designed by Sir Percy Thomas in the neoclassical style and was officially opened by The Duke of Kent on 23 October 1934.

The design envisaged a building finished in white Portland stone, and included a  art deco clock-tower, making it a landmark. The clock-tower featured the prow of a Viking longship, jutting out on each side as a reminder of Sweyn Forkbeard, thought to be the founder of Swansea. Bronze busts depicting the local Members of Parliament, David Matthews, David Williams, Percy Morris and David Grenfell,  were subsequently installed outside the council chamber. Percy Thomas won the Bronze Medal for Architecture from the Royal Institute of British Architects for his work in 1935.

Despite the prominence of the building from the air, the building emerged unscathed in February 1941 during the Swansea Blitz of the Second World War.

On 3 July 1969, The Prince of Wales made an announcement in person at the Guildhall that the town of Swansea would become a city.

For most of the 20th century, the Guildhall was the meeting place of Swansea City Council; however, it ceased to be the local seat of government when the enlarged City and County of Swansea Council was formed at Swansea Civic Centre in 1996. It continues to accommodate the city's law courts and also the council's administration offices. The Guildhall clock was last overhauled in 2019.

See also
 Guild
 Guildhall

References 

City and town halls in Wales
Government buildings in Wales
Grade I listed buildings in Swansea
Grade I listed office buildings
Percy Thomas buildings
Government buildings completed in 1934
Towers in Wales
Art Deco architecture in Wales
1934 establishments in Wales